Capis curvata, known generally as the curved halter moth or bog capis moth, is a species of moth in the family Noctuidae (the owlet moths). It is found in North America.

The MONA or Hodges number for Capis curvata is 9059.

References

Further reading

 
 
 

Eustrotiinae
Articles created by Qbugbot
Moths described in 1882